International Automotive Design (IAD UK Ltd) was a British design company, based in West Sussex, England.

IAD UK Ltd was founded in 1976 by John and Yvonne Shute. Initially work came in the form of design services for Rail cars which then led to Automotive Body and Chassis Engineering but due to the increasing customers requirements it soon expanded to encompass everything from Design/ Styling and Engineering through to small-scale production.
IAD UK Ltd had at its peak a large R&D facility in Worthing, West Sussex, UK plus 5 overseas operations in the USA (California and Detroit), France (5 facilities), Spain and Germany (3 facilities) along with liaison offices in Korea, Japan and Russia. The US, German and Spanish offices having their own Styling studios.
It was the world's largest R&D consultancy not only working in Automotive, Commercial Vehicles and Aerospace. The British company was in competition with Italdesign, Pininfarina, Bertone. By the early 1990s the company employed over 1400 professionals. The majority of the projects completed by IAD was never made public keeping the high level of security that John Shute believed was the key to customers allowing IAD to be considered for future projects.

The company was awarded the Queen's Award for Export and Industry many times and ultimately John was appointed an OBE (Order of the British Empire) by Queen Elizabeth II for his endeavors on behalf of the British Motor industry.IAD Worthing Herald Article

IAD designed and developed many cutting edge and memorable concept cars developed as showcases demonstrating the company's creative and engineering expertise including the IAD Alien, IAD Hunter, IAD Interstate, IAD Arrival, IAD Royale, IAD Mini MPV, IAD Venus and finally the IAD Magia. IAD amassed a talented group of designers, engineers and prototype builders who have subsequently gone on to senior positions within the automotive industry.

They specialized in car prototyping and engineering design. Mayflower Corp. purchased IAD after it went into receivership in the early 1990s with the Engineering, Design groups and facilities were sold to Daewoo Motors 1993.

The Mazda MX5 (Miata) was one of the many projects IAD was involved in, developing not only Exterior and Interior style for the vehicle in the UK/ US (California) but also building prototypes locally prior to volume production in 1989. Mazda came to IAD to replicate the "true" British sports car invoking the MG's success of handling, and even directed the Chassis team to copy the exhaust note of early MGBs.

Personnel

The founder John Shute was a great entrepreneur who was a tough but shrewd businessman. He saw possibilities for 
expansion in the Automotive R&D consultancy business and grabbed it.
He had a knack along with his sales team of getting projects out of a manufacturer which would often led to bigger projects later on. Overall John, who died from cancer in the 1990s was an enigmatic character who suffered fools badly but rewarded people who tried.

Board Members
Mike Hyatt - Director of Programs
Yvonne Shute - Board Secretary
Mike Goldsmith - Director of Sales
Peter Waters - Human Resources Director/ Director of IAD Consulting
Trevor Lacey - Engineering Director
Guy Hudson - IT Director
Godfrey Harker - Finance Director
J.Mason - Operations Director
J.Singer -

Divisional Directors
Bill Livingstone - Spanish Operations
Neil Brooker - Director Asia/Pacific Operations
Bill Anthony - France Operations
Alan Jackson - Studio Director
Greg Greeson- German Operations
Carl Meyers - US East Coast Operations
 
and others

Design Directors
Eddie Pepall
Trevor Fiore
Alan Jackson

Designers
Martin Longmore (Alien, Impact, Hunter)
Marcus Hotblack (Alien, Impact, Hunter)
Tony Pettman (Interstate)
Michael Ani (Venus, Magia)
Cindy Charwick
Robin Austin
Patrick Raymond
Andrew Barber
Chris Longmore 
Brian Osborn (Magia)
Dave Cutcliffe
Taewan Kim
Bill Barranco (Royale)
Chris Garfield
Dave Ancona (Hunter)
Jose Diaz de la Vega (Royale)
Robin Lock

.

Projects
Some of the companies IAD worked for include:
Asia Motors
Audi
Austin Rover
BAE Systems
Bentley/Rolls-Royce
BMW
British Airways
Bova
DAF
Daihatsu
Daewoo Motors
Fiat/Alfa Romeo/Lancia
Ford
GM
Hino
JCB
Kia
Land Rover
Lincoln
Logicar
Lotus
Mazda
McLaren
Pegaso
Renault
Saab
Subaru
Suzuki
Tyrrell Racing
Volvo
Yamaha
Yugo

References

External links
An article about the company
Main website

Automobile designers
Automotive companies of England
Companies based in West Sussex
Design companies of the United Kingdom
1976 establishments in England
Defunct companies of England